Catahoula National Wildlife Refuge, located in east central Louisiana, United States,  east of Jena, was established in 1958 as a wintering area for migratory waterfowl. The refuge contains  divided into two units. The  Headquarters Unit borders nine miles (14 km) of the northeast shore of Catahoula Lake, a  natural wetland renowned for its large concentrations of migratory waterfowl. This acquisition was made possible through a partnership agreement between The Conservation Fund, American Electric Power, and the Fish and Wildlife Service. The habitat found at the refuge is primarily lowland hardwood forest subject to seasonal backwater flooding from the Ouachita, and Red Rivers.

Wildlife
White-tailed deer, small game mammals, songbirds, raptors, waterbirds, reptiles, and amphibians are commonly seen throughout the refuge. Waterfowl are abundant during the winter. Peak waterfowl populations of 75,000 ducks have been recorded. In 1979, the Duck Lake Impoundment was created to provide  of waterfowl habitat. Management of the impoundment is to manipulate water levels to promote the growth of aquatic and moist soil vegetation. In 2001, Catahoula NWR was designated a Globally Important Bird Area. Catahoula Lake is recognized as a Wetlands of International Importance (Ramsar site): a historic concentration area for shorebirds, waterbirds, and migrating/wintering waterfowl. Catahoula NWR also borders a portion of the Dewey Wills Wildlife Management Area. Together, these areas provide a haven for wildlife and preserve representative samples of the unique habitats originally found in the Lower Mississippi River Ecosystem.

See also
List of National Wildlife Refuges: Louisiana

References

Protected areas of Catahoula Parish, Louisiana
Protected areas of LaSalle Parish, Louisiana
National Wildlife Refuges in Louisiana
Protected areas established in 1958
Wetlands and bayous of Louisiana
Landforms of Catahoula Parish, Louisiana
Landforms of LaSalle Parish, Louisiana